Nesa Rural District is in Asara District of Karaj County, Alborz province, Iran. At the census of 2006, its population was 6,081 in 1,617 households, and in the most recent census of 2016, it had decreased to 5,069 in 1,681 households. The largest of its 18 villages was Velayat Rud, with 1,382 people.

References 

Karaj County
Rural Districts of Alborz Province
Populated places in Alborz Province
Populated places in Karaj County